Verkhneuralsk is a town and the administrative center of Verkhneuralsky District in Chelyabinsk Oblast, Russia, located in the upper streams of the Ural River,  southwest of Chelyabinsk, the administrative center of the oblast. Population:

History
Founded in 1734 as the fortress of Verkhneyaitskaya, it was renamed Verkhneuralskaya after the Yaik River was renamed the Ural. Town status was granted to it in 1781.

Administrative and municipal status
Within the framework of administrative divisions, Verkhneuralsk serves as the administrative center of Verkhneuralsky District. As an administrative division, it is incorporated within Verkhneuralsky District as the Town of Verkhneuralsk. As a municipal division, the Town of Verkhneuralsk is incorporated within Verkhneuralsky Municipal District as Verkhneuralskoye Urban Settlement.

References

Notes

External links
Pictures of Verkhneuralsk 

Cities and towns in Chelyabinsk Oblast
Verkhneuralsky Uyezd